The men's  pole vault at the 2022 European Athletics Championships took place at the Olympiastadion on 18 and 20 August.

Records

Schedule

Results

Qualification
Qualification: 5.80 m (Q) or best 12 performances (q)

Final

References

Pole vault M
Pole vault at the European Athletics Championships